Following his victory in the presidential election on 1 December 2016, the newly elected President Adama Barrow appointed a new cabinet to succeed the cabinet of Yahya Jammeh, his predecessor. Barrow was formally inaugurated on 19 January 2017 at the embassy of the Gambia in Dakar, Senegal, and was able to return the Gambia on 26 January. He made the bulk of appointments in February 2017, and conducted a major reshuffle in June 2018.

History 

It was announced that Barrow would return to The Gambia from Senegal on 26 January 2017, having been sworn-in at the Gambian embassy there on 19 January due to the 2016–17 Gambian constitutional crisis. He said that his ministers would be announced on 31 January, and that they would have to declare their assets before taking up office. The names were in fact only revealed at their swearing-in on 1 February. Among the appointments were UDP treasurer & Professional Accountant Amadou Sanneh, women's rights activist Isatou Touray, UN prosecutor & Lawyer Ba Tambadou, Main Opposition Party leader (UDP) & Senior Barrister Ousainou Darboe, NRP leader Hamat Bah, former Agriculture minister Omar A. Jallow, and GMC leader & lawyer Mai Fatty.

Following the swearing-in ceremony, Barrow promised to appoint the remaining cabinet members by the end of the week. There were no members of the People's Democratic Organisation for Independence and Socialism (PDOIS) appointed to the cabinet because they decline positions offered to them, though both Sidia Jatta and Halifa Sallah were to be part of Barrow's new think tank, Agency For Sustainable Socio-Economic Development (ASSED). Five further appointments to the cabinet were made on 22 February, with Fatoumata Tambajang becoming Minister of Women's Affairs overseeing the Office of Vice-President.

Tambajang was formally sworn-in as Vice-President on 9 November 2017, after Barrow passed a constitutional amendment regarding the age limit. The first alteration was on 10 November, when Mai Fatty was relieved of his appointment as Minister of the Interior. He later denied that he was relieved due to being involved in corruption. 29 June 2018 saw a major cabinet reshuffle announced, with Ousainou Darboe becoming Vice-President, Mamadou Tangara becoming Minister of Foreign Affairs, and Mambury Njie becoming Minister of Finance and Economic Affairs, with several other shuffles and appointments. The new ministers were sworn-in during a ceremony on 9 July 2018.

Composition

Key

  = Member of the Gambia Moral Congress (GMC)
  = Member of the Gambia Party for Democracy and Progress (GPDP)
  = Member of the National Convention Party (NCP)
  = Member of the National Reconciliation Party (NRP)
  = Member of the People's Progressive Party (PPP)
  = Member of the United Democratic Party (UDP)
  = Independent politician

References:

Other senior appointees 

Presidents of the Gambia can also make other senior appointments, that do not sit in the Cabinet. Barrow has made the following appointments:

Military and security

Diplomacy

Office of the President

Other

Notes

References 

Politics of the Gambia
Government of the Gambia